In telecommunications, quadruple play or quad play is a marketing term combining the triple play service of broadband Internet access, television and telephone with wireless service provisions. This service set is also sometimes referred to as "The Fantastic Four".

In addition to being a testament to technological convergence, quadruple play also involves a diverse group of stakeholders, from large Internet backbone providers to smaller startups.

Advances in LTE and other technologies are rapidly improving the ability to transfer information over a wireless link at various combinations of speeds, distances, and non-line-of-sight conditions.

"Mobile service provisions" refers in part to the ability of subscribers to purchase mobile phone like services, as is often seen in co-marketing efforts between providers of landline services. It also reflects the ambition to gain wireless access on the go to voice, internet, and content/video without tethering to a network via cables.

Companies 
In the UK, the merging of NTL and Telewest with Virgin Mobile resulted in Virgin Media offering a "quadruple play" of cable television, broadband Internet, landline phones, and mobile, with prices for some contracts as low as £30 a month. It is marketed as "the simplest way for customers to get all their household communications from one provider". BT Group launched its own quad play services in March 2015 ahead of its purchase of EE Limited running its mobile offering on the EE network.

In Hong Kong, PCCW first claims to be "the only operator in Hong Kong that offers a genuine quadruple-play experience". In 2016, HKBN entered the quad play market with a disruptive pricing strategy. 

In the United States, many telephone companies like AT&T, Verizon, CenturyLink, Cincinnati Bell, Hawaiian Telcom, Consolidated Communications (formerly SureWest), and formerly, BellSouth, Embarq,  Qwest, and Cox (in some markets), have quad-play bundling, as well as Comcast's Xfinity, which has begun quad-play bundling on April 6, 2017, when it introduced wireless service on the Verizon Wireless 4G LTE network.

See also 
 Dual play
 Fixed–mobile convergence
Triple play

References 

Telecommunications economics
Digital television